The Mallee Park Football Club is an all indigenous Australian rules football club that plays football in the Port Lincoln Football League in Port Lincoln, South Australia. The clubs most famous for having 13 players with links to the club making it to the big stage in the AFL; with the notable likes including Shaun Burgoyne, Eddie Betts and Byron Pickett.

Club achievements

1985 (first premiership) 
Being founded only in 1981, the Peckers still managed to make the grand final for 3 consecutive years in 1982, 83 and 84 but just falling short. However, this did not stop Mallee Park from powering through the 1985 season to beat Waybacks by 24 points in a high scoring affair which reversed the results of the previous grand final in 1984 where Waybacks defeated Mallee Park. The premiership side included some big names: featuring people like Harry Miller Snr (father of Harry Miller Jnr) as coach who also played in the forward-line, Eddie Betts II (Father of Eddie Betts III) and Byron Picket Snr (Father of Byron Picket Jnr). This premiership is what would kick off the start of the Mallee Park dynasty where from 1985 to 2001 they would make 16 grand finals, winning 11 of them.

References

Australian rules football clubs in South Australia
1981 establishments in Australia
Australian rules football clubs established in 1981